The 2020 Myrtle Beach Bowl was a college football bowl game played on December 21, 2020, with kickoff at 2:30 p.m. EST on ESPN. It was the inaugural edition of the Myrtle Beach Bowl, and the first of the 2020–21 bowl games concluding the 2020 FBS football season. The game was the first NCAA bowl game to be played in the state of South Carolina, and the first bowl to be played in the state since the 1947 Pecan Bowl.

Teams
The 2020 Myrtle Beach Bowl was contested by the Appalachian State Mountaineers, from the Sun Belt Conference, and the North Texas Mean Green, from Conference USA. The game was the first matchup between the two teams.

Appalachian State

Appalachian State of the Sun Belt accepted their bid on December 13, 2020. The Mountaineers entered the bowl with an overall record of 8–3 (6–2 in conference play); they were ranked at number 24 in the AP Poll early in the season.

North Texas

North Texas of C-USA accepted their bid on December 13, 2020. The Mean Green entered the bowl with an overall record of 4–5 (3–4 in conference play). This marked the third time in program history that North Texas entered a bowl game with a losing record (the prior instances being the 2001 New Orleans Bowl and the 2016 Heart of Dallas Bowl).

Game summary

Statistics

Notes

References

External links

 Game statistics at statbroadcast.com

Myrtle Beach Bowl
Myrtle Beach Bowl
Myrtle Beach Bowl
Myrtle Beach Bowl
Appalachian State Mountaineers football bowl games
North Texas Mean Green football bowl games